Mis 40 en Bellas Artes is a live album released by Juan Gabriel from Palacio de Bellas Artes in Mexico on May 6, 2014. A DVD is included with the album, showing Gabriel's performance and behind-the-scenes footage.

Track list
All tracks written by Juan Gabriel.
Disc 1

Disc 2

Charts

Weekly charts

Year-end charts

Certification

References 

Juan Gabriel live albums
2014 live albums
Fonovisa Records live albums
Spanish-language live albums